Twistees is a brand of Maltese snacks which is now widely exported. Twistees are produced by Darrell Lee Foods at a factory in Marsa which was originally established by Ray Calleja. The most popular snack food in Malta, Twistees are sold in the UK, under the Tastees  brand. They are also exported to Libya, the Middle East and Germany. Twistees are a rice-based snack manufactured by a baking process. The most popular form of the snack are the original Cheesy Twistees, with Smokey Barbeque Twistees, Twistees Lite and Chicken Twistees added to the range over the years. The Twistees Sharing packet comes in a 150g size bag, compared to the standard 50g size packet. Tastees are variant, bacon-flavoured Twistees. Twistees celebrated its 50-year anniversary in 2011. Twistees were subject to a product recall in 2011.

References 

Brand name snack foods
Maltese cuisine